KTFW-FM (92.1 FM, branded as "Hank FM") is a country music radio station focusing on serving the western half of the Dallas–Fort Worth metroplex. Licensed to Glen Rose, Texas, United States, it strongly emphasizes classic, traditional, and neotraditional country music. The station is owned and operated by LKCM Radio Group, along with sister stations "95.9 The Ranch" in Jacksboro, Texas, and 106.9 The Ranch" in Corsicana, Texas. Although its office is located in downtown Fort Worth, its transmitter is located in Glen Rose, Texas.

History
FC Dallas Major League Soccer games previously aired on KTFW.

By January 6, 2012, KTFW had tweaked its country format to include country music from the 1970s to present day and was rebranded as "Hank FM".

By September 2018, KTFW had rebranded as "Real Country 92.1 Hank FM" with the slogan: "Playing the best country from the 80's and 90's and George Strait every hour." It is the flagship station for Aledo Bearcats High School football and hosted the Gary Patterson Radio Show (Former Head Football Coach of the TCU Horned Frogs) during football season, typically on Thursday nights.

References

External links

 DFW Radio/TV History

TFW
Country radio stations in the United States
FC Dallas
1989 establishments in Texas